Camiguin forest rat, or Camiguin bullimus (Bullimus gamay) is one of three species of rodents in the genus Bullimus. It is endemic to the island of Camiguin, the Philippines.

References

Bullimus
Rats of Asia
Endemic fauna of the Philippines
Rodents of the Philippines
Fauna of Camiguin
Mammals described in 2002